On the Strength is the second  and final studio album by Grandmaster Flash and the Furious Five. Released in 1988, it was the full line-up's last album together. Although certainly contributing to the album itself, Cowboy (Keith Wiggins) was not present for the album or single photo shoots.

The album was reissued in the US on CD in 2005 (Collectors' Choice Music, CCM-585-2) but once again (see Ba-Dop-Boom-Bang) omitted the bonus track (*) that was originally included on both the original CD and cassette versions of the album.

Track listing
"Gold" – 4:25
"Cold in Effect" – 2:28
"Yo Baby" – 4:31
"On the Strength" – 4:45
"The King" – 3:19
"Fly Girl" – 5:13
"Magic Carpet Ride" (featuring Steppenwolf) – 4:14
"Leave Here" – 3:50
"This Is Where You Got It From" – 4:06
"The Boy Is Dope" – 3:11
"Back in the Old Days of Hip-Hop" – 4:05 (*)

Notes
"Back in the Days of Hip-Hop" also appeared as the B-side of the UK and US Gold 7-inch single and the Magic Carpet Ride 12" single.

Personnel
Artist & Repertoire: Raoul Roach
Grandmaster Flash (Joseph Sadler) – turntables, drum programming, Flashformer transform DJ device, background vocals
Keef Cowboy (Keith Wiggins) – Lead and background vocals, writer and arranger
Grandmaster Melle Mel (Melvin Glover) – Lead and background vocals, writer and arranger
The Kidd Creole (Nathaniel Glover Jr.) – Lead and background vocals, writer and arranger
Scorpio (Eddie Morris) – Lead and background vocals, writer and arranger
Rahiem (Guy Todd Williams) – Lead and background vocals, writer and arranger
Guy Vaughn – keyboards, drum programming, and vocals on The Boy Is Dope
Afrika Bambaataa (Kevin Donovan) – music and drum-sound consultant
Jesse Daniels Force MD's – vocals on Fly Girl
Arthur "Disco B" Hayward – additional scratches and assistant to the Grandmaster
Ray (Ray Roll) Cortez – vocals on The Boy Is Dope

References

1988 albums
Grandmaster Flash and the Furious Five albums
Elektra Records albums
Albums produced by Grandmaster Flash